John Elmer Carson (October 27, 1910 – January 2, 1963) was a Canadian-born American film actor. Carson often played the role of comedic friend in films of the 1940s and 1950s, including The Strawberry Blonde (1941) with James Cagney and Arsenic and Old Lace (1944) with Cary Grant. He also acted in dramas such as Mildred Pierce (1945), A Star is Born (1954), and Cat on a Hot Tin Roof (1958). He worked for RKO and MGM (where he was cast opposite Myrna Loy and William Powell in Love Crazy, 1941), but most of his notable work was for Warner Bros.

Early years
John Elmer Carson was born on October 27, 1910 in Carman, Manitoba to Elmer and Elsa Carson (née Brunke). He was the younger brother of actor Robert Carson (1909–1979). His father was an executive with an insurance company. In 1914, the family moved to Milwaukee, Wisconsin, which he always thought of as his home town. He attended high school at Hartford School, Milwaukee, and St. John's Military Academy in Delafield, Wisconsin, and at Carleton College, he acquired a taste for acting. Carson became a U.S. citizen in 1949.

Because of his size – 6 ft 2 in (1.9 m) and 220 lb (100 kg) – his first stage appearance (in a collegiate production) was as Hercules. In the midst of a performance, he tripped and took half the set with him. Dave Willock, a college friend, thought it was so funny he persuaded Carson to team with him in a vaudeville act – Willock and Carson – and a new career was born with "a very successful comedy team that played large and small vaudeville theatres everywhere in North America".  After the act with Willock broke up, Carson teamed with dancer Betty Alice Lindy for appearances in theaters on the Orpheum Circuit.

Radio 
Radio was another source of employment for the team, starting with a 1938 appearance on the Kraft Music Hall when Bing Crosby hosted the show. In 1942–1943, he was host of The Camel Comedy Caravan, and in the next season he starred in The New Jack Carson Show, which debuted on June 2, 1943. Charles Foster wrote about the show in Once Upon a Time in Paradise: Canadians in the Golden Age of Hollywood: "It broke audience records regularly during the four years it was on the air. Hollywood's biggest stars ... lined up to do guest spots on the show."

In 1947–1948, he starred in The Sealtest Village Store.

Film career

His success in radio led to the start of a lucrative film career. During the 1930s, as vaudeville declined from increased competition from radio and the movies, Willock and Carson sought work in Hollywood. Carson initially landed bit roles at RKO Radio Pictures in films such as Bringing Up Baby (1938), starring Cary Grant and Katharine Hepburn.

An early standout role for Carson was as a mock-drunk, undercover G-Man opposite Richard Cromwell in Universal Pictures's anti-Nazi action drama titled Enemy Agent. This led to contract-player status with Warner Brothers. While there, he was teamed with Dennis Morgan in a number of popular films known as the "Two Guys" movies, supposedly to compete with Paramount's popular Bing Crosby – Bob Hope Road to … pictures.

Most of his work at Warner Brothers was limited to light comedy work with Morgan, and later Doris Day (who in her autobiography gave credit to Carson as one of her early Hollywood mentors). Critics generally agree that Carson's best work was in Mildred Pierce (1945), where he played the perpetually scheming Wally Fay opposite Joan Crawford in the title role. Also in 1945, he played the role of Harold Pierson, the second husband of Louise Randall, played by Rosalind Russell, in Roughly Speaking. Another role which won accolades for him was as publicist Matt Libby in A Star is Born (1954). One of his later film roles was as the older brother Gooper in Cat on a Hot Tin Roof (1958).

Television 
From 1950 to 1951, Carson was one of four alternating weekly hosts of the comedy-variety show Four Star Revue. (The others were veterans Jimmy Durante and Ed Wynn, and up-and-coming young Danny Thomas.) The second season was his last with the show, when it was renamed All Star Revue.

Carson also had his own variety program The Jack Carson Show from 1954 to 1955) and was the announcer on the television version of Strike It Rich.

His TV appearances, extending into the early 1960s, included The Guy Mitchell Show, and The Polly Bergen Show in 1957; Alcoa Theatre and Bonanza (Season 1, Ep.9: "Mr. Henry Comstock") in 1959; Thriller ("The Big Blackout") in 1960; The Twilight Zone (Season 2, Ep. 14: "The Whole Truth") in 1961; and in perhaps his last TV appearance in Alfred Hitchcock Presents (Season 7, Ep. 35: "The Children of Alda Nuova") from June 5, 1962.

His TV pilot Kentucky Kid was under consideration as a potential series for NBC, but was shelved when Carson became ill with stomach cancer. Carson would have played a veterinarian who raises horses and who has an adopted Chinese child. The series was revived by NBC as Kentucky Jones starring Dennis Weaver in the Carson role.

Legacy
On February 8, 1960, Carson received two stars on the Hollywood Walk of Fame for his contributions to the television and radio industry. The television star is located at 1560 Vine Street, the radio star is at 6361 Hollywood Boulevard.

In 1983, after his death, Jack Carson was inducted into the Wisconsin Performing Artists Hall of Fame along with Dennis Morgan, who was also from Wisconsin.

Personal life
Carson and Elizabeth Lindy were married in 1938 and divorced 1939. He was married to Kay St. Germain from 1941 to 1950. He and Lola Albright were married from 1952 to 1958. Carson was married from 1961 until his death in 1963 to Sandra Jolley, former wife of actor Forrest Tucker and daughter of actor I. Stanford Jolley. Carson had a romantic relationship with Doris Day in 1950–1951, but she left him for Marty Melcher, who became her third husband.

On August 26, 1962, while rehearsing the play Critic's Choice in Andover, New Jersey, he collapsed on stage. An early diagnosis deemed it a stomach disorder, but two months later, stomach cancer was discovered while he was undergoing an unrelated operation. He died in Encino on January 2, 1963, at age 52. Dick Powell, who Carson had known for years, also died January 2, 1963 aged 58. Carson was entombed in Forest Lawn Memorial Park Cemetery.

His brother Robert was also a character actor.

Selected filmography

You Only Live Once (1937) (with Henry Fonda) – Attendant in First Gas Station (uncredited)
Too Many Wives (1937) (with Anne Shirley) – Hodges
It Could Happen to You (1937) – Truck Driver (uncredited)
On Again-Off Again (1937) – Cop (uncredited)
Reported Missing (1937) – Logantown Airport Radioman (uncredited)
Music for Madame (1937) – Assistant Director
Stage Door (1937) (with Katharine Hepburn, Ginger Rogers and Lucille Ball) – Mr. Milbanks
Stand-In (1937) – Tom Potts
A Damsel in Distress (1937) – Bit Role (uncredited)
High Flyers (1937) (with Bert Wheeler, Robert Woolsey, and Lupe Vélez) – Dave Hanlon
Quick Money (1937) – Coach Woodford
She's Got Everything (1937) – Ransome (uncredited)
Crashing Hollywood (1938) – Dickson
Everybody's Doing It (1938) – Detective Lieutenant (uncredited)
Bringing Up Baby (1938) (with Katharine Hepburn and Cary Grant) – Circus Roustabout (uncredited)
Night Spot (1938) – Shallen
Maid's Night Out (1938) – Rollercoaster Ride Attendant (uncredited)
Condemned Women (1938) – Plainclothes Policeman (uncredited)
This Marriage Business (1938) – 'Candid' Perry
Go Chase Yourself (1938) – Warren Miles
Law of the Underworld (1938) – Johnny
Vivacious Lady (1938) (with Ginger Rogers and James Stewart) – Charlie – Waiter Captain
The Saint in New York (1938) (with Louis Hayward as Simon Templar) – Red Jenks
Having Wonderful Time (1938) – Emil Beatty
Carefree (1938) (with Fred Astaire and Ginger Rogers) – Connors
Mr. Doodle Kicks Off (1938) – Football Player Rochet
The Kid from Texas (1939) (with Dennis O'Keefe and Buddy Ebsen) – Stanley Brown
Fifth Avenue Girl (1939) (with Ginger Rogers) – Minnesota – a Sailor (uncredited)
The Escape (1939) – Chet Warren
Mr. Smith Goes to Washington (1939) (with James Stewart) – Sweeney Farrell – Newsman (uncredited)
Legion of Lost Flyers (1939) (with Richard Arlen and Andy Devine) – Larry Barrigan
Destry Rides Again (1939) (with Marlene Dietrich and James Stewart) – Jack Tyndall
The Honeymoon's Over (1939) – Tom Donroy
City of Chance (1940) – Narration – Prologue (voice, uncredited)
Parole Fixer (1940) (with William Henry) – George Mattison
I Take This Woman (1940) (with Spencer Tracy and Hedy Lamarr) – Joe
Young as You Feel (1940) – Norcross
Shooting High (1940) – Gabby Cross
Enemy Agent (1940) (with Richard Cromwell) – Ralph
Typhoon (1940) (with Dorothy Lamour and Robert Preston) – Mate
Alias the Deacon (1940) – Sullivan
Girl in 313 (1940) – Police Lt. Pat O'Farrell
Queen of the Mob (1940) (with Ralph Bellamy) – FBI Agent Ross Waring
Lucky Partners (1940) (with Ronald Colman, Ginger Rogers, Spring Byington and Harry Davenport) – Freddie
Sandy Gets Her Man (1940) – Policeman Tom Garrity
Love Thy Neighbor (1940) – Policeman
Mr. & Mrs. Smith (1941) (with Carole Lombard and Robert Montgomery) – Chuck Benson
The Strawberry Blonde (1941) (with James Cagney and Olivia de Havilland) – Hugo Barnstead
Love Crazy (1941) (with William Powell and Myrna Loy) – Ward Willoughby
The Bride Came C.O.D. (1941) (with James Cagney and Bette Davis) – Allen Brice
Navy Blues (1941) (with Ann Sheridan) – 'Buttons' Johnson
Blues in the Night (1941) – Leo Powell
The Male Animal (1942) (with Henry Fonda and Olivia de Havilland) – Joe Ferguson
Larceny, Inc. (1942) (with Edward G. Robinson and Jane Wyman) – Jeff Randolph
Wings for the Eagle (1942) (with Ann Sheridan) – Brad Maple
Gentleman Jim (1942) (with Errol Flynn, Alan Hale, William Frawley and Ward Bond) – Walter Lowrie
The Hard Way (1943) (with Ida Lupino) – Albert Runkel
Thank Your Lucky Stars (1943) (with Bette Davis, Errol Flynn, Ida Lupino and Olivia de Havilland) – Himself
Princess O'Rourke (1943) (with Olivia de Havilland, Robert Cummings and Charles Coburn) – Dave Campbell
Shine On, Harvest Moon (1944) (with Ann Sheridan) – The Great Georgetti
Make Your Own Bed (1944) (with Jane Wyman and Alan Hale) – Jerry Curtis
The Doughgirls (1944) (with Ann Sheridan and Alexis Smith) – Arthur Halstead
Arsenic and Old Lace (1944) (with Cary Grant and Priscilla Lane) – Officer Patrick O'Hara
Hollywood Canteen (1944) – Himself
Roughly Speaking (1945) (with Rosalind Russell) – Harold C. Pierson
Mildred Pierce (1945) (with Joan Crawford, Ann Blyth and Eve Arden) – Wally Fay
One More Tomorrow (1946) (with Ann Sheridan and Jane Wyman) – Patrick 'Pat' Regan
Two Guys from Milwaukee (1946) (with Dennis Morgan) – Buzz Williams
The Time, the Place and the Girl (1946) (with Dennis Morgan and Janis Paige) – Jeff Howard
Love and Learn (1947) (with Martha Vickers) – Jingles Collins
April Showers (1948) (with Ann Sothern) – Joe Tyme
Romance on the High Seas (1948) (with Janis Paige, Don DeFore, and Doris Day) – Peter Virgil
Two Guys from Texas (1948) (with Dennis Morgan, Dorothy Malone and Bugs Bunny) – Danny Foster
John Loves Mary (1949) (with Ronald Reagan, Wayne Morris and Edward Arnold) – Fred Taylor
My Dream Is Yours (1949) (with Doris Day and Bugs Bunny) – Doug Blake
It's a Great Feeling (1949) (with Doris Day) – Himself
The Good Humor Man (1950) (with George Reeves and Lola Albright) – Biff Jones
Bright Leaf (1950) (with Gary Cooper and Lauren Bacall) – Chris Malley – Dr. Monaco
Mr. Universe (1951) (with Vince Edwards) – Jeff Clayton
The Groom Wore Spurs (1951) (with Ginger Rogers) – Ben Castle
Dangerous When Wet (1953) (with Esther Williams and Fernando Lamas) – Windy Weebe
Red Garters (1954) (with Rosemary Clooney) – Jason Carberry
A Star Is Born (1954) (with Judy Garland and James Mason) – Matt Libby
Phffft (1954) (with Judy Holliday, Jack Lemmon, and Kim Novak) – Charlie Nelson
Ain't Misbehavin' (1955) (with Rory Calhoun) – Hal North
The Bottom of the Bottle (1956) (with Van Johnson and Joseph Cotten) – Hal Breckinridge
Magnificent Roughnecks (1956) (with Mickey Rooney) – Bix Decker
The Tattered Dress (1957) (with Jeff Chandler, Jeanne Crain, Gail Russell) – Sheriff Nick Hoak
The Tarnished Angels (1957) (with Rock Hudson, Robert Stack, and Dorothy Malone) – Jiggs
Cat on a Hot Tin Roof (1958) (with Elizabeth Taylor, Paul Newman, and Burl Ives) – Gooper Pollitt
Rally Round the Flag, Boys! (1958) (with Paul Newman, Joanne Woodward, and Joan Collins) – Capt. Hoxie
The Bramble Bush (1960) (with Richard Burton) – Bert Mosley
The Big Bankroll (1961) (with David Janssen) – Timothy W. 'Big Tim' O'Brien
Sammy the Way Out Seal (1962, episode of anthology TV series Walt Disney's Wonderful World of Color) (with Robert Culp and Billy Mumy) – Harold Sylvester

Radio appearances

Notes

References

Further reading

External links

 
 
 
 
 Jack Carson Tribute Website

1910 births
1963 deaths
20th-century American male actors
20th-century Canadian male actors
Burials at Forest Lawn Memorial Park (Glendale)
Canadian emigrants to the United States
Canadian male film actors
Canadian male radio actors
Canadian male stage actors
Canadian male television actors
Carleton College alumni
Deaths from cancer in California
Deaths from stomach cancer
Male actors from Manitoba
Male actors from Milwaukee
People from Carman, Manitoba
Warner Bros. contract players